Robert Crowe may refer to:
Robert Crowe (cyclist) (born 1968), Australian cyclist
Robert Crowe (singer), American sopranist
Robert E. Crowe (1879–1958), Chicago lawyer and politician
Robert Crowe (MP) for Philipstown (Parliament of Ireland constituency)

See also
Bob Crowe (disambiguation)
Robert Crow (disambiguation)